David Howitt may refer to:

 Dave Howitt (born 1952), English footballer
 David Howitt (entrepreneur) (born 1950), American business consultant